William Howard Wheat (February 19, 1879 – January 16, 1944) was a U.S. Representative from Illinois.

Born in Kahoka, Missouri, Wheat attended the public schools of Brookfield and Chillicothe, Missouri, and Chaddock College and Gem City Business College, Quincy, Illinois. He served as clerk in clothing stores in Quincy and Bloomington, Illinois. He moved to Thomasboro, Illinois, in 1900, becoming engaged as bookkeeper and later cashier of a bank. In 1909 moved to Rantoul, Illinois, and served as vice president and president of banking institutions. He was also interested in agriculture. He was school treasurer of Rantoul, Illinois, for a number of years. He was an unsuccessful candidate for election to the Seventy-fifth Congress.

Wheat was elected as a Republican to the Seventy-sixth, Seventy-seventh, and Seventy-eighth Congresses and served from January 3, 1939, until his death in Washington, D.C., January 16, 1944. He was interred in Maplewood Cemetery, Rantoul, Illinois.

See also
 List of United States Congress members who died in office (1900–49)

References

1879 births
1944 deaths
Republican Party members of the United States House of Representatives from Illinois
People from Rantoul, Illinois
People from Kahoka, Missouri